The Bradshaw Town Hall, also known as the Bradshaw Civic Center, is a historic building in Bradshaw, Nebraska. It was built in 1902-1903 to house town hall meetings on the first floor and Freemason conclaves on the second floor. It was later repurposed as a community center. It has been listed on the National Register of Historic Places since May 31, 1984.

References

National Register of Historic Places in York County, Nebraska
Government buildings completed in 1902
Masonic buildings in Nebraska